Vincent John Chapman (born 5 December 1967 in Newcastle upon Tyne) is a former professional footballer who played as a defender in the Football League for Huddersfield Town and  Rochdale after starting his career at Wallsend Boys Club and then Tow Law Town.

References

1967 births
Living people
Footballers from Newcastle upon Tyne
English footballers
Association football defenders
Wallsend Boys Club players
Huddersfield Town A.F.C. players
Rochdale A.F.C. players
English Football League players
Place of birth missing (living people)
Tow Law Town F.C. players